Gill Man may refer to:

 Gill-man, the titular creature of the Creature from the Black Lagoon series of movies
 A prehistoric creature allied with alien invaders in the strategy video game X-COM: Terror from the Deep
 Reptilian mermaids from the Aquaman cartoon "Goliaths of the Deep-Sea Gorge"